"Blended Family (What You Do for Love)" is a song by American recording artist Alicia Keys, featuring vocals from rapper ASAP Rocky. It was written by Keys, Rocky, John Bush, Brandon Aly, Tish Hyman, Dave Kuncio, John Houser, Kenneth Withrow and Edie Brickell for her sixth studio album Here (2016), while production was helmed by Keys and Mark Batson. The song refers to the former marriage of Keys' husband Swizz Beats and musician Mashonda Tifrere. It was released on October 7, 2016 by RCA Records.

Background and release 
The song is inspired by family and in particular the themes are those of adoption and extended families. Keys was inspired by her family composed of her husband Swizz Beatz, their two sons Egypt Daoud Dean and Genesis Ali Dean, and Beatz's son Kasseem Dean Jr from his previous marriage with Mashonda Tifrere. Keys, following the controversy that arose due to the alleged dating of the singer-songwriter with Beatz, dedicated the song to Tifrere, writing:«The understanding, compassion and support we’ve found is a powerful testament to the healing that comes when we choose love. Especially for the kids … the most important part of our lives. Celebrating Mashonda for our commitment to each other with support and true growth»

Music video
The music video, filmed in black-and-white, was released on November 11, 2016, and features both Keys and ASAP Rocky. In September 2017 it was revealed on IMDb that the video was directed by Hype Williams.

Track listing

Charts

Weekly charts

Year-end charts

Release history

References

2016 singles
2016 songs
Alicia Keys songs
ASAP Rocky songs
RCA Records singles
Songs written by Alicia Keys
Songs written by ASAP Rocky
Songs written by Edie Brickell
Song recordings produced by Mark Batson
Hip hop songs
Black-and-white music videos
Songs written by Mark Batson
Music videos directed by Hype Williams
Song recordings produced by Alicia Keys